NIST may refer to:
National Institute of Standards and Technology, a non-regulatory agency of the United States Department of Commerce
National Institute of Science and Technology, an engineering college in Pallur Hills, Orissa, India
NIST International School, an international school located in downtown Bangkok, Thailand
NIST (metric), a method for evaluating the quality of text which has been translated using machine translation